Joshua Brown (born January 21, 1994) is a Canadian professional ice hockey defenceman for the Arizona Coyotes of the National Hockey League (NHL). He was selected in the sixth round, 152nd overall, by the Florida Panthers in the 2013 NHL Entry Draft. Prior to joining the Coyotes, Brown played for the Ottawa Senators, Boston Bruins and the Panthers.

Playing career

Junior career
Brown played as a youth locally in his hometown of London, Ontario at the midget level with the London Jr. Knights and later the Whitby Fury of the Ontario Junior Hockey League (OJHL).

He began his major junior career with the Oshawa Generals in the Ontario Hockey League (OHL) after he was selected 44th overall in the 2010 OHL Priority Selection. Using his large frame as a physical, defensive defenseman, Brown remained with the Generals throughout his junior career, captaining the club for two seasons and capturing the Memorial Cup in his final junior season in 2014–15.

Professional career
Selected by the Panthers in the 2013 NHL Entry Draft in the sixth round, 152nd overall, Brown was later signed to a three-year, entry-level contract with Florida on April 10, 2015. In his first professional season, Brown split the 2015–16 season, between the Panthers American Hockey League (AHL) affiliate, the Portland Pirates,  and the Manchester Monarchs of the East Coast Hockey League (ECHL). He appeared in 54 games with the Monarchs, totaling 12 points, and appearing in a first-round playoff series.

In his first full campaign in the AHL, Brown spent the 2016–17 season with the Panthers new affiliate, the Springfield Thunderbirds. In the Thunderbirds' inaugural season, he notched a career best 3 goals and 13 points from the blueline in 72 games. He followed that up the next season with one goal and ten points in 66 games with Springfield.

As an impending restricted free agent, Brown agreed to a two-year, two-way contract extension to remain within the Panthers organization on May 31, 2018. In the 2018–19 season, Brown returned to the Thunderbirds for his third year with the club. After adding 3 goals in 19 games, Brown received his first call-up to the NHL by the Panthers on January 18, 2019. Recalled due to an injury to fellow defenseman, MacKenzie Weegar, and with the Panthers needing a physical presence, Brown made his NHL debut in a 3–1 victory over the Toronto Maple Leafs at BB&T Center in Sunrise, Florida, on January 19, 2019.

In his first full season with the Panthers in 2019–20, Brown appeared in a career high 56 games posting three goals and 8 points. In need of a new contract Brown was traded in the following off-season by the Panthers to the Ottawa Senators in exchange for a 2020 fourth-round draft pick on October 2, 2020. As a restricted free agent, Brown was then signed a two-year, $2.4 million contract with the Senators on October 5, 2020. During the  season, Brown was placed in COVID-19 protocol on November 10, 2021 and returned on November 20. On November 26, 2021, Brown suffered an upper-body injury that kept him out of the lineup until January 13, 2022.

On March 21, 2022, Brown was traded by the Senators, along with a 2022 conditional seventh-round selection, to the Boston Bruins in exchange for Zachary Senyshyn and a 2022 fifth-round draft pick. He finished the 2021–22 season with a combined six points in 52 games played with the Senators and Bruins.

On July 13, 2022, having left the Bruins as a free agent, Brown was signed to a two-year, $2.55 million contract with the Arizona Coyotes.

Career statistics

Awards and honours

References

External links

1994 births
Living people
Arizona Coyotes players
Boston Bruins players
Canadian ice hockey defencemen
Florida Panthers draft picks
Florida Panthers players
Ice hockey people from Ontario
Manchester Monarchs (ECHL) players
Oshawa Generals players
Ottawa Senators players
Portland Pirates players
Sportspeople from London, Ontario
Springfield Thunderbirds players